Corianino is a small village  (curazia) in eastern San Marino. It belongs to the castle of Faetano.

Geography
Corianino is located in the middle of its castle, on the road between Faetano and Borgo Maggiore.

See also
Faetano
Cà Chiavello
Calligaria
Monte Pulito

Curazie in San Marino
Faetano